A khurpa is a short handled cutting tool similar to a Trowel with a flat blade used for digging soil and weeding in small gardens or vegetable farms. It is commonly use in small farms or in ridges or rows of vegetables to hoewing or earth up the weeds.  It is traditionally used while in a squatting posture. The work khurpa is word of Punjabi language.

It is in Punjab and other areas in India for various processes like tilling, bed preparation, weeding and digging at small scale.

References 

Gardening tools
Mechanical hand tools
Squatting position